Jeff Manza is an American sociologist and professor of sociology at New York University. He is a political sociologist, known for his work on voting behavior, public opinion, and felony disenfranchisement in the United States (with Christopher Uggen). He has also researched the relationship between support for government programs and economic downturns. He created The Sociology Project, a series of introductory sociology textbooks written by himself and NYU colleagues that aim to reorient the presentation of sociological ideas to beginning students.

References

Jeff Manza and Clem Brooks, Social Cleavages and Political Change, Oxford University Press 1999
Jeff Manza, Fay Lomax Cook, and Benjamin Page, Navigating Public Opinion, Oxford University Press 2002
Jeff Manza and Christopher Uggen, Locked Out: Felon Disenfranchisement in the United States Oxford University Press 2006
Clem Brooks and Jeff Manza, Why Welfare State Persist University of Chicago Press 2007
Clem Brooks and Jeff Manza, Whose Rights? Counterterrorism and the Dark Side of U.S. Public Opinion Russell Sage Foundation Press 2013

External links
Faculty page

Living people
American sociologists
New York University faculty
Northwestern University faculty
University of California, Berkeley alumni
Political sociologists
1962 births